General elections were held in the Republika Srpska entity of Bosnia and Herzegovina on 12 October 2014 as part of the Bosnian general elections. Incumbent President Milorad Dodik was re-elected, running on a joint Alliance of Independent Social Democrats–Democratic People's Alliance–Socialist Party platform, whilst his Alliance of Independent Social Democrats remained the largest in the National Assembly.

Results

President

National Assembly

See also
2014 Bosnian general election
2014 Federation of Bosnia and Herzegovina general election

References

Republika Srpska
2014 in Bosnia and Herzegovina
Elections in Republika Srpska
Election and referendum articles with incomplete results